The Keystone Corridor is a 349-mile (562 km) railroad corridor between Philadelphia and Pittsburgh, Pennsylvania, that consists of two rail lines: Amtrak and SEPTA's Philadelphia-to-Harrisburg main line, which hosts SEPTA's Paoli/Thorndale Line commuter rail service, and Amtrak's Keystone  and Pennsylvanian inter-city trains; and the Norfolk Southern Pittsburgh Line. The corridor was originally the Main Line of the Pennsylvania Railroad.

Since 2006, the line has been one of the high-speed corridors designated by the Federal Railroad Administration (FRA).

Amtrak runs two intercity rail services along the Keystone Corridor: the Harrisburg-to-New York City Keystone Service and the Pittsburgh-to-New York City Pennsylvanian. SEPTA operates daily Paoli/Thorndale commuter rail service between Philadelphia and Thorndale on the Philadelphia-to-Harrisburg main line. The towns along this stretch form a socio-cultural region called the "Philadelphia Main Line".

The tracks from Pittsburgh to Harrisburg are owned and maintained by Norfolk Southern, which acquired them from Conrail. They include the Horseshoe Curve west of Altoona. The tracks between Harrisburg and Philadelphia are owned and maintained by Amtrak, and are the only part of the Keystone Corridor that is electrified. The tracks join the Northeast Corridor at Zoo Interlocking near the Philadelphia Zoo and 30th Street Station.

History 
The right-of-way that would become the Keystone Corridor was mainly laid by two railroads. The tracks east of Dillerville, just west of Lancaster, were originally the Philadelphia and Columbia Railroad, part of the state-owned Main Line of Public Works. From Lancaster west to Harrisburg, the tracks were laid by the Harrisburg, Portsmouth, Mount Joy and Lancaster Railroad. Except for minor realignments, today's Keystone Corridor runs along the same path.

Both lines eventually became part of the Pennsylvania Railroad's (PRR) main line.

In 1915, the PRR  electrified the line from Philadelphia's Broad Street Station to Paoli, then the west end of commuter service. Electrification west of Paoli to Harrisburg came in the 1930s, after the PRR completed electrifying its New York-Washington, D.C. section (the present-day Northeast Corridor). The total cost of electrification topped $200 million, which was financed by government-supported loans from the Reconstruction Finance Corporation and the Public Works Administration.

Passenger service remained unprofitable, returned to profitability during World War II, and then slumped again. The PRR overhauled much of the right-of-way in the 1950s, but chose to keep paying a stable dividend rather than reinvest in infrastructure. The result was dilapidated stations, slow, disjointed track conditions, and antiquated rolling stock which frequently broke down.

In 1968, the PRR merged with the New York Central to become Penn Central, which declared bankruptcy in 1970. In 1976, Amtrak took ownership of the line between Philadelphia and Harrisburg while Conrail (the merger of Penn Central, the Reading Company, and several other Class I railroads) took ownership of the remaining part of the line and the many branches, both electrified and non-electrified, that the Penn Central had owned. Amtrak took over the express Harrisburg-New York intercity rail service in 1971, while Conrail, under SEPTA auspices, continued Harrisburg-Philadelphia commuter services. In 1983, SEPTA took over all commuter services and extended operations to Parkesburg (later truncated in 1996 to Downingtown, but later extended to Thorndale).

Penn Central made an agreement with the federal government to provide a high-speed service called the Metroliner, which upgraded the Northeast Corridor tracks between New York and Washington by 1969, but neglected other areas such as the Keystone Corridor, a lack of maintenance that continued after Amtrak's takeover in 1976. The Keystone Corridor eventually served as a "depository" for the problem-prone Metroliner electric multiple unit cars. Amtrak also used electric locomotive-hauled trains for Harrisburg-New York service. Before the introduction of Acela electric high-speed service over the Northeast Corridor, and after facing a shortage of electric locomotives (both E60 and AEM-7 models), Amtrak used GE Genesis diesel locomotives between Harrisburg and Philadelphia, with an engine change to an electric (usually AEM-7) locomotive at 30th Street Station. Due to the slower schedules combined with higher ticket prices and competition from SEPTA, ridership declined.

The line between Philadelphia and Lancaster was four tracks until the 1960s, when the PRR removed two of the tracks west of Paoli. The line is now two tracks from Paoli to Harrisburg, save for a three-track section between the Glen and Park interlockings, and a four-track section between the Downs and Thorn interlockings.

There are also curves which require slower speeds (especially in the section between Merion and Overbrook), and speed restrictions within interlocking limits.

High-speed corridor 

In 1999, the Keystone Corridor was formally recognized as a "designated high speed corridor" by the FRA, as part of the TEA-21 transportation bill. The Commonwealth of Pennsylvania will fund half of the project's costs, and Amtrak will fund the other half.

The goals of this project include:
 90-minute travel time between Harrisburg and Philadelphia on express trains
 105-minute travel time on normal trains
 Raising track speed to   where possible
 Increasing the number of daily round trips from 11 to 14
 Replacing diesel trains with electric on Keystone service
A summary appears in an FRA report.

Construction on the USD $145 million project began on March 7, 2005 and was completed in Fall, 2006. Amtrak's press releases have summarized the improvements as:
 Installation of 80 track miles (128 km) of new concrete ties
 Installation of more than 40 new track switches
 A new signal system between Lancaster and Harrisburg
 Upgrade of 16 existing bridges and culverts
 Upgrade of overhead electrical wires (catenary)
 Upgrade of electrical substations to support use of electric locomotives.

The installation of concrete ties also included replacement of the old jointed rail with new continuous welded rail (136 RE), track surfacing, and alignment. Track surfacing is adjusting the vertical profile of the two rails, leveling the rails on straight track and introducing superelevation (banking) in curves. The  are broken down as:
  on track 4 from Park (Parkesburg) to Cork (Lancaster) interlockings
  on track 1 from Cork (Lancaster) to Park (Parkesburg) interlockings
  on track 3 from Paoli to Overbrook
  on track 2 from Overbrook to Paoli

Amtrak replaced the signal and communications system and rebuilt the overhead catenary wire and upgraded electrical substations to provide the power needed to operate several electric trains simultaneously on this line.  Since October, 2006, Amtrak, having sufficient Acela high-speed trainsets, started using electric push-pull trainsets for the first time since the mid-1990s. Using AEM7 locomotives and former Metroliner m.u. coaches modified into a push-pull cab-coach (with the locomotive "pulling" westbound trains and "pushing" eastbound), the electrified service is currently used on the Harrisburg-New York Keystone service, while the Genesis diesel locomotives are still used for the Pittsburgh-New York Pennsylvanian service. As on the Northeast Corridor, Amtrak trains between Paoli and Overbrook use the high-speed inner rails for normal operations.

In March 2011, Pennsylvania received a $750,000 grant from the High-Speed Intercity Passenger Rail Program to investigate extending high-speed electrified service from Harrisburg to Pittsburgh.

At-grade crossings with roads between Philadelphia and Harrisburg remained until 2014. In July 1999, PennDOT budgeted $9 million for this project to eliminate the three remaining crossings; however, these funds were later used for other projects. One of the crossings was in Elizabethtown and another in Mount Joy. The third, between Mount Joy and Lancaster, was blocked off using fencing and jersey barriers. Additional funding from the American Recovery and Reinvestment Act of 2009 was used to complete the elimination of all at-grade crossings. The last was closed in 2014. Private crossings remain between Philadelphia and Harrisburg. There are still grade crossings between Harrisburg and Pittsburgh.

Earlier studies 

There have been earlier studies by the USDOT and FRA of the Keystone Corridor, and these studies contain proposals or speculations which might not be in the currently funded projects. Some of these ideas are below.

Amtrak service to Suburban Station, which is in Center City Philadelphia, ended in 1988. An early study says that PennDOT used Suburban Station as the Philadelphia endpoint for the 90-minute service to Harrisburg. Restoring service to Suburban Station may increase ridership but would require using the upper level of 30th Street Station and either scheduling trains to turn at Suburban Station or to continue through the Center City Commuter Tunnel (with Amtrak trains turning around at Wayne Junction).

Bypassing 30th Street Station by using the New York-Pittsburgh Subway would allow trains to skip a time-consuming stop and reverse of directions at 30th St Station and allow fast service between New York and Harrisburg. Historically, the PRR fast trains going to NY from the west would bypass 30th St Station, and passengers for Philadelphia would change trains at North Philadelphia. One study suggested two daily electric-train round-trips between New York and Harrisburg with stops in North Philadelphia and Ardmore, a routing last used by Keystone trains in 1994.

Track reconfiguration between Zoo and Overbrook interlockings can increase track speeds which are usually   due to the need to take diverging routes through switches. Reducing the number of diverging moves and the use of   switches can increase speeds. Also, the reconfiguration can allow for the removal of the overhead bridge that the R6 Cynwyd trains use. Some other interlockings may be removed or reconfigured. With the reconfiguration near Zoo, the Overbrook interlocking can be removed and replaced with 4 through tracks. Bryn Mawr interlocking may have storage tracks added west of the station to allow R5 Bryn Mawr locals to turn without occupying an express track. Paoli interlocking may be removed if the four-track configuration were to continue west of the station. Paoli station may be reconfigured with high-level island platforms serving all four tracks, as part of a new Paoli transportation center. Frazer interlocking may be reconfigured for turning SEPTA trains and as the point where four tracks become two.

Electrification may be converted to use commercial 60 Hz AC power instead of the special 25 Hz single-phase AC currently in use, although this is doubtful due to the costs involved, lack of real benefits and dedicated 25 Hz hydro-electric capacity at the Safe Harbor Dam. The Safe Harbor Dam also generates electricity for the Northeast Corridor itself, the power going from the dam to the NEC (at Perryville, Maryland), via a  pylon network. Between Paoli and 30th Street Station, most of the overhead electric wire and other electrification system components date back to the original 1915 electrification, although the 1915 substations have been retired. West of Paoli the electrification dates from the late 1930s, and west of Downingtown the system is still controlled by the original 1939 power dispatching office in Harrisburg, utilizing electromechanical systems.

Construction progress 
The four-track section between Overbrook and Paoli is numbered sequentially from the southernmost track (number 1 track) to the northernmost track (number 4 track).

Between March 7 and June 27, 2005, Amtrak worked on the number 4 track between Lancaster and Parkesburg, and from June 27 to September 2, 2005, they worked on number 1 track. The track layout at Lancaster station was simplified so that trains no longer have to take a diverging route to access the station platforms. Because tracks 2 and 3 have been removed, tracks 1 and 4 are the only tracks in this section.

Between October 3, 2005 and mid-December, Amtrak worked on the number 2 track from Paoli to a point between Narberth and Merion stations. On March 20, 2006, Amtrak started working on the number 3 track, starting within Paoli interlocking and working east towards Overbrook. As of April 6, 2006, a track laying system (TLS) has completed work to approximately milepost 16.7. 110-mph service started on October 30, 2006 following completion of a $145 million upgrade of the 104-mile line. Push-pull express trains will cut journey time from the current two hours to 90 minutes. Local service will improve to 105 minutes. Three weekday and two weekend roundtrips will be added as well.

Services 

The busiest part of the Keystone Corridor is the segment between Harrisburg and New York City, which sees multiple trains per day.

Amtrak 
The following Amtrak rail lines serve Keystone Corridor stations:
Capitol Limited – to/from Chicago and Washington D.C. stops at Pittsburgh, the westernmost stop on the Pennsylvanian route.
 Keystone Service – local service along the Northeast Corridor between New York and Philadelphia, and along the Keystone Corridor between Philadelphia and Harrisburg. Timings vary by day of the week in each direction, and some trains to/from Harrisburg terminate at and start from Philadelphia.
 Pennsylvanian – between Pittsburgh and Philadelphia along the Keystone Corridor and between Philadelphia and New York on the Northeast Corridor.

Commuter rail 

SEPTA Regional Rail operates commuter rail service on the Keystone Corridor between 30th Street Station and Thorndale as the Paoli/Thorndale Line service. Efforts to re-extend the line to Parkesburg and even to Atglen were under discussion by state Congressman Jim Gerlach, R-PA 6, and the Delaware Valley Regional Planning Commission. On March 7, 2019, it was announced that SEPTA service would be extended back to Coatesville "in the near future", with a new Coatesville station to be built.

The Cynwyd Line service also uses the line between 30th Street Station and the Valley interlocking. The proposed Schuylkill Valley Metro service to Reading would have also used this line. There is also a proposal to shift the line to eliminate a deteriorating truss bridge.

A project to bring commuter rail service between Harrisburg and Lancaster called the Capital Red Rose Corridor proposed to bring rail service to South Central Pennsylvania. In 2011, after numerous proposals, the project was cancelled due to a lack of political will and funding.

SEPTA's capital budget for fiscal year 2006 financed an $80.594 million project with Amtrak to improve infrastructure along the line. SEPTA's effort to improve tracks 1 and 4 between Zoo and Paoli interlockings, included:
 Installation of 85,000 concrete crossties, track surfacing, and alignment
 Replacement of jointed rail with continuous welded rail
 Upgraded signal and communication systems
 Replacement of Bryn Mawr interlocking tracks
 Reconfiguration and replacement of Paoli interlocking tracks
 Improvements to pedestrian underpasses and ROW retaining walls

Freight service 

Norfolk Southern operates overnight freight service between the western junction of the Trenton Cutoff (a former Penn Central electrified "through-freight" line) and just west of Parkesburg via trackage rights, mainly supplying the ArcelorMittal steel plate manufacturing plant in Coatesville. Norfolk Southern also operates Enola Yard, a major freight classification yard near Harrisburg. Two other electrified through-freight lines, the Atglen and Susquehanna Branch (a.k.a. the Low-Grade Line) and the Philadelphia and Thorndale Branch, were abandoned by Conrail before its purchase by Norfolk Southern, with NS still maintaining the Low-Grade Line due to the catenary poles servicing the Keystone Corridor between Lancaster and Middletown, while the former has been looked at by the Delaware Valley Regional Planning Commission as a possible "Cross-County Metro" project connecting Thorndale with Trenton, New Jersey.  Although there is electrified service on portions of the line all freight traffic is served using diesel locomotives.

Former services 
The Broadway Limited, a train that operated between Chicago and New York, used the Keystone Corridor between Pittsburgh and Philadelphia and the Northeast Corridor between Philadelphia and New York. Originally a Pennsylvania Railroad train, this route was discontinued by Amtrak in 1995 but later restarted by the passenger rail company and renamed the Three Rivers. The Three Rivers was discontinued in 2005. (Amtrak's current Chicago-to-Washington, D.C. service, the Capitol Limited, uses the rail line west of Pittsburgh).

Stations

See also 
 High-speed rail in the United States

References

Further reading

External links 
Plan the Keystone – PennDOT
Keystone Corridor on Google Maps

Amtrak
Pennsylvania Railroad lines
SEPTA Regional Rail
High-speed railway lines in the United States
Electric railways in Pennsylvania